Key Ideas In Human Thought is a compilation of several thousand short essays on some of the most important terms and concepts that have shaped the modern world. Arranged alphabetically according to topic, the essays covers such topics as art, literature, mathematics and many others. Many of the essays include both cross-references and reading lists. Newsweek magazine called it "the year's best browse."

Hardcover Edition: , published by Facts on File in 1993.

Paperback Edition: , published by Prima Publishing in 1995.

Both editions are edited by Kenneth McLeish.

References

Philosophy books
Sociology books